The Bürgenstock Resort (also Bürgenstock Resort Lake Lucerne) is a Swiss hotel and tourism complex situated above Lake Lucerne in Canton Nidwalden. The resort is located on the Bürgenberg and comprises a total of 30 buildings, including four hotels and a number of sports facilities. It is the largest integrated hotel resort in Switzerland. The complex is built above ridge offering north-facing views of the lake 450 metres below. Linking resort and lake is the Bürgenstock railway. Views to the south encompass mountains and scattered settlements on their flanks. The resort is of cultural and historical significance.

History 
Franz Josef Bucher and Josef Durrer (1841–1919) were businessmen from Kerns, Canton Obwalden. They had a sawmill and a factory making wood flooring in Kerns. To keep their workforces in employment, the two men built the Hotel Sonnenberg in Engelberg in 1869/70, which they were able to sell at a profit one year after completion.

Their company Bucher & Durrer purchased Alp Tritt on the Bürgenberg in 1871 and applied the name Bürgenstock to their new hotel development. The Grand Hotel opened on 23 June 1873 under its original name of Hotel Kurhaus. Bucher acquired sole control of the company in 1877. In 1886 and 1887 he built a hydroelectric plant on the Engelberger Aa river in Buochs to power the funicular railway between the lake and the Bürgenstock and the Stanserhorn funicular railway. In 1888 the company opened the Bürgenstock railway and began provision of the resort's water supply. Also in 1888 the Park-Hotel opened, followed by the Bürgenstock Chapel in 1892, the Palace Hotel in 1904, and the erection of a number of villas to the east of the latter between 1900 and 1905. The Hammetschwand Elevator opened in 1905.

Friedrich Frey-Fürst (1882–1953) purchased the Bürgenstock hotels in 1925. From 1925 to 1948 the three hotels underwent significant renovation. A golf course opened in 1928. Management of the resort passed to Friedrich Frey's son Fritz on the former's death in 1953. Fritz Frey made a number of changes to the buildings and infrastructure. During the tenure of Fritz Frey and his family, the actors Sophia Loren, Audrey Hepburn and Sean Connery and politicians such as Jimmy Carter and Henry Kissinger stayed as guests on the lakeside mountain.

The family sold the Bürgenstock Resort to the major Swiss bank UBS in 1996. The buildings were acquired in 2000 by Richemont Héritage SA of Vich, Canton Vaud together with five other five-star hotels indebted to the UBS for about CHF 115 million. The company changed its name to Rosebud Hotels Holding SA in 2003 after disposing of its Hotel Richemont. The Barwa Real Estate Company, domiciled in the Emirate of Qatar, took a 50% holding in the company's assets in 2007 which, alongside the Bürgenstock hotels, comprised the Schweizerhof in Bern and Royal Savoy in Lausanne. The Barwa Real Estate Company separated from Rosebud Hotels Holding SA in 2008 to become sole owner of the Bürgenstock Resort. The Barwa Real Estate Company transferred its Swiss hotel portfolio to the Qatari Diar Real Estate Investment Company in 2009. The latter is wholly owned by the State of Qatar; its subsidiary QDHP Swiss Management AG was responsible for managing the Swiss hotel projects. In 2011 Katara Hospitality, a subsidiary of the Qatar Investment Authority (the Emirate of Qatar's sovereign wealth fund), became the new investor. The Bürgenstock Selection brand was created that same year. This incorporates the new Bürgenstock Resort, the Hotel Royal Savoy in Lausanne and the Hotel Schweizerhof in Bern. The Swiss activities were transferred in 2012 to Katara Hospitality Switzerland AG, domiciled in Zug. The latter is the company that operates the hotels in Switzerland.

On the southern side of the Bürgenstock is the Villa Honegg, a hotel built and opened in 1906 by Emil Durrer (1873–1923), a nephew of Franz Josef Bucher. It remained a family-run establishment until 1977. Following further renovation, the hotel reopened in 2011.

In the 1950s and 1960s Audrey Hepburn and Mel Ferrer married in the chapel on the Bürgenstock in 1954. Sophia Loren and her husband Carlo Ponti resided for seven years in one of the chalets.

German Chancellor Konrad Adenauer spent the summer months of July and August 1950 in the resort and conducted affairs of state there. Jawaharlal Nehru had a holiday in the resort in 1951, accompanied for the first time by his daughter Indira Gandhi. Two years later he met Austria’s foreign minister there, Karl Gruber. The film crew shooting the James Bond film Goldfinger spent a month at the Palace-Hotel in 1964 alongside Bond actor Sean Connery.

Buildings and extensions since 2014 

The cornerstone for the new resort was laid on 26 March 2014. The resort on the Bürgenberg is completely car-free and comprises 30 buildings. These include four hotels ranging in standard from three to five star Superior and offering a total of 383 rooms and suites: the Bürgenstock Hotel (5* Superior), the Waldhotel – Healthy Living (5*), the Palace Hotel (4* Superior) and the Pension Taverne 1879 (3*). Also emerging is a  conference centre capable of accommodating up to 900 persons. The resort also features 68 “residence suites”, 12 restaurants and bars. It is scheduled to open in summer 2017, and is planned to operate all year round. The total investment volume is expected to reach around CHF 500 million.

The resort will have a  spa with an indoor and an outdoor area and three swimming pools, a  sauna, a Turkish bath, steam room, showers and whirlpool baths, and a gym. The Waldhotel Healthy Living will offer medical treatments including convalescence and revitalisation, diagnostics and medical check-ups, beauty and healthy ageing, weight management, and meditation.

The 9-hole golf course was re-opened on 25 June 2016. On the same day, the foundation and the University of Teacher Education Lucerne opened a  learning trail on the cliff path.

CHF 43 million are being invested in monument and landscape conservation measures. The old Stickerei building has been restored to its original plans, while the historically important Palace-Hotel, which dates from 1906, is being renovated in compliance with requirements imposed by heritage and monument agencies.
The Swiss Inventory of Cultural Property of National and Regional Significance (the KGS inventory) lists a number of buildings and facilities in the Bürgenstock Resort deemed worthy of protection. The inventory draws a distinction between assets of national importance (A assets) and of regional importance (B assets). "A" assets in the Bürgenstock Resort include the pool in the Bürgenstock Club, the Stickerei building, the Gübelin building, the weather station, and the “Rondelle”. The resort's "B" assets are the Palace-Hotel, the Blockhaus, the Spycher storage sheds, the Grand Hotel, the Restaurant & Pension Taverne 1879, the Bürgenstock Railway, and the Hammetschwand Lift.

The buildings and facilities of the Bürgenstock Resort are also listed in the Federal Inventory of Swiss Heritage Sites (ISOS). The Lake Lucerne landscape with Kernwald, Bürgenstock and Rigi is listed in the Federal Inventory of Landscapes and Natural Monuments of National Importance.

In a 2012 study, BAK Basel Economics AG wrote that the new resort will provide economic benefits to the Central Swiss region. The study predicted that the new Bürgenstock Resort will attracted new affluent visitors to the region, generating 150,000 extra overnight stays. According to the study, revenues generated by the new Bürgenstock Resort once fully up and running could be in the region of CHF 100 million for the resort, and 40 million for its suppliers. The study estimates that the Bürgenstock project will generate annual tax revenues of about CHF 8 million for the cantons and municipalities of Central Switzerland. By 2020, the latter's cumulative tax revenues directly attributable to the resort's operations could reach CHF 33 million. It is estimated that one job is created outside the resort for every three inside it. In terms of employment in Canton Nidwalden's economy as a whole, the resort's share is 3.6 percent.

References

External links 
 Hansjakob Achermann: Bürgenstock, Historical Dictionary of Switzerland (German)
 History of the Bürgenstock-Hotels on the website of Bürgenstock Kunst- und Kulturstiftung (German)

Hotels in Switzerland
Hospitality companies of Switzerland
Cultural heritage of Switzerland
Buildings and structures in Nidwalden